Arena Ludwigsburg, also known as MHPArena, is an indoor sporting arena that is located in Ludwigsburg, Germany. The seating capacity of the arena for basketball games is 5,325 spectators.

History
Arena Ludwigsburg has been primarily used to host basketball games, and it hosts the home games of the German professional basketball team, MHP Riesen Ludwigsburg, of the Basketball Bundesliga.  It replaced Rundsporthalle Ludwigsburg as the home of EnBW Ludwigsburg.

References

External links
Venue homepage
Article on arena

Indoor arenas in Germany
Basketball venues in Germany
Handball venues in Germany
Sports venues in Baden-Württemberg
Buildings and structures in Ludwigsburg